The 2015 Stockton Challenger was a professional tennis tournament played on outdoor hard courts. It was the first edition of the tournament and part of the 2015 ITF Women's Circuit, offering a total of $50,000 in prize money. It took place in Stockton, California, United States, on 13–19 June 2015.

Singles main draw entrants

Seeds 

 1 Rankings as of 29 June 2015

Other entrants 
The following players received wildcards into the singles main draw:
  Brooke Austin
  Danielle Lao
  Jamie Loeb
  Alexandra Stevenson

The following players received entry from the qualifying draw:
  Kristie Ahn
  Heidi El Tabakh
  Storm Sanders
  Chanel Simmonds

Champions

Singles

 Nao Hibino def.  An-Sophie Mestach, 6–1, 7–6(8–6)

Doubles

 Jamie Loeb /  Sanaz Marand def.  Kaitlyn Christian /  Danielle Lao, 6–3, 6–4

External links 
 2015 Stockton Challenger at ITFtennis.com
 Official website

2015 ITF Women's Circuit
2015
Tennis tournaments in California
Sports competitions in Stockton, California
2015 in sports in California